is a monthly magazine publication originating from Japan, covering anime (and to a lesser extent, tokusatsu, manga, Japanese science fiction, seiyuu, and video games). It was launched by publishing company Kadokawa Shoten on March 8, 1985, with its April issue, and has since seen regular release on the 10th of every month in its home country. Newtype Korea is published in Korea. Spin-off publications of Newtype also exist in Japan, such as Newtype Hero/Newtype the Live (which are dedicated to tokusatsu) and NewWORDS (which is geared toward a more mature adult market), as well as numerous limited-run versions (such as Clamp Newtype).

The name of the magazine comes from the "Newtypes" in the Universal Century timeline of the Gundam series, specifically Mobile Suit Gundam (1979) and its sequel Mobile Suit Zeta Gundam (1985). Newtype magazine launched a week after Zeta Gundam began airing on March 2, 1985.

Newtype USA was an English language version that was published in North America between 2002 and 2008.

Content

Columns
Newtype runs several columns per month, typically written by creators within the anime and manga industries. Past and current contributors include Satsuki Igarashi (of Clamp), Mahiro Maeda, and Gilles Poitras. Newtype USA included columns from more history-minded writers (such as Jonathan Clements) as well as individuals involved in the US anime industry (such as Monica Rial).

Manga
Newtype usually contains a center insert with regularly serialized manga (often to be later published in tankōbon form by Kadokawa). The magazine is perhaps best known in Japan for serializing Mamoru Nagano's The Five Star Stories.

Manga serialized in Newtype USA varied due to licensing reasons.  They had included Full Metal Panic!, Angel/Dust, Chrono Crusade, Lagoon Engine Einsatz, Neon Genesis Evangelion: Angelic Days, the Aoi House 4-koma, Angel/Dust Neo, and Kobato. only several of which actually appeared in the Japanese Newtype.

Fiction
Light novels have also been serialized within the Japanese version of the magazine in the past: these have included "For the Barrel" (an abstract adaptation of the Mobile Suit Gundam novel trilogy); a novelization of Overman King Gainer (accompanied by illustrations from the show's character designer, Kinu Nishimura); and the Yoshiyuki Tomino story "Gaia Gear", set in the far future of Gundams Universal Century timeline.

Television schedule
A large insert within the magazine usually contains a television schedule for anime and tokusatsu programs set to run on various Japanese networks throughout the coming month, accompanied by synopses for each aired episode and network ratings for each show from the previous month.

Art-related material
Newtype contains a tip column for working with computer graphics in manga-style illustration, written by a different guest illustrator (or group of illustrators, in some cases) each month. The column generally centers around working with Adobe Photoshop and Corel Painter.

In the Japanese version (and in the early months of the American version), the last page of Newtype is usually reserved for one of a series of art pieces or illustrations (accompanied by comment or short column) from a known anime illustrator. Perhaps the best known of these is the "GUNDAM FIX" illustration series by Hajime Katoki, which placed mecha from the Gundam franchise within real-world photographic contexts. Other illustrators who have contributed to this back page in the past include Yoshikazu Yasuhiko (who ran a series of illustrations devoted to Mobile Suit Gundam: The Origin) and Hisashi Hirai (who ran a series devoted to his designs for Mobile Suit Gundam SEED, titled "Gundam SEED RGB").

International versions
Newtype USA included both translated Japanese content and original U.S. material. Content included anime, manga, music, game, toy and model reviews, director interviews, artist profiles, and regular columns by industry experts, tastemakers and deep-cover insiders. Newtype USA also included bonus content, such as posters, postcards, a centerfold spread, serialized manga, and a DVD insert. Newtype USA was published by A.D. Vision, parent company of the anime distributor ADV Films and manga publisher ADV Manga, but the magazine still featured content and promotional material from properties distributed by competing publishers. About 70% of the material is translated from the Japanese release, including matching cover and front story, and articles from American writers. Subscriptions on initial release were expected to hit 50,000.

The first Newtype USA issue was published in November 2002 (a preview issue of Newtype USA featuring RahXephon was distributed selectively at anime and comic conventions in the late summer of 2002). and ended publication after the February 2008 issue. After its initial print run, sealed polybagged back issues of Newtype USA are considered highly collectible. It was replaced in 2008 with PiQ magazine, which ceased publication after four issues.

Newtype was also published in South Korea by Daiwon C.I. under the name Newtype Korea. The first issue was released in July 1999, and the magazine lasted until February 2014 when the last issue was published. The magazine included translated Japanese content, with added emphasis on domestic Korean animation projects.  Daiwon C.I. also used the Newtype branding for a line of imported Japanese animation DVDs and light novels, called Newtype DVD and Newtype Light Novel, respectively. Both the original Japanese and English editions used the "right-to-left" format while the Korean edition is reversed.

Newtype Anime Awards

See also
 List of animation awards

References

External links
 
Newtype Korea (Daiwon C.I.)
Newtype USA (archived)

1985 establishments in Japan
ADV Films
Anime and manga magazines
Anime awards
Anime magazines published in Japan
Kadokawa Shoten magazines
Magazines established in 1985
Magazines published in Tokyo
Monthly manga magazines published in Japan